Yerra Cheruvu Palli or YC Palli is a small village located in Kadapa District of Andhra Pradesh in India.

References

Villages in Kadapa district